Antonino D'Agostino (born 8 October 1978) is an Italian professional footballer who plays as a midfielder for ASD Monastir Kosmoto. He played in Serie A for Atalanta and Cagliari.

Career 
D'Agostino started his career at CND team Lascaris, and joined Serie C2 team U.S. Pro Vercelli Calcio in 1998. He was spotted by Serie B team Treviso F.B.C. 1993 in January 2003 on co-ownership deal, and Treviso obtain full ownership a year later.

Atalanta
D'Agostino was sold to Udinese Calcio in June 2005. However, on 1 July 2005, D'Agostino was sold to Atalanta B.C. in a co-ownership deal for €800,000 in a five-year contract, as part of a mega swap deal with the relegated side. (Manfredini and D'Agostino to Atalanta for €2 million; 50% registration rights of Motta (€2.05 million), Rossini (€450,000) and Morosini; 100% registration rights of Gotti and Natali to Udinese for undisclosed fees.)

In June 2006, Atalanta signed D'Agostino outright for free; Udinese signed Morosini for an undisclosed fee, Rossini for free.

He was loaned to Cagliari in the same summer, playing his first Serie A season. The club decided not to sign him at the end of season.

On 2 February 2009, he was loaned to Parma. On 17 July 2009, his contract with Atalanta was mutually terminated.

Late career
In September 2009, he was announced as new signing for Cagliari-based Eccellenza Sardinia club Progetto Sant'Elia. He returned into professionalism only a few months later, joining Ascoli in January 2010. In 2011, he came to Romania by signing with Gloria Bistriţa. 

After six and a half seasons with Tortoli Calcio, 41-year old D'Agostino joined ASD Monastir Kosmoto playing in the Calcio a 5 Serie B on 23 December 2019.

References

External links
  Atalanta B.C. Official Player Profile

1978 births
Living people
Footballers from Turin
Italian footballers
Italian expatriate footballers
F.C. Pro Vercelli 1892 players
Treviso F.B.C. 1993 players
Atalanta B.C. players
Cagliari Calcio players
Parma Calcio 1913 players
Ascoli Calcio 1898 F.C. players
ACF Gloria Bistrița players
A.S.D. Selargius Calcio players
Liga I players
Serie A players
Serie B players
Serie C players
Serie D players
Eccellenza players
Expatriate footballers in Romania
Italian expatriate sportspeople in Romania
Association football midfielders